Hermann Christlieb Matthäus Stein, from 1913 von Stein (13 September 1854, in Wedderstedt – 26 May 1927, in Kloster Lehnin) was a Prussian officer,  General of the Artillery and Minister of War during World War I. He was a recipient of Pour le Mérite.

Awards
 Iron Cross II Class
 Iron Cross I Class 
 Pour le Mérite (1 September 1916)

References

Gothaisches Genealogisches Taschenbuch, Teil B 1941, Seite 480, Verlag Justus Perthes, Gotha 1941
Genealogisches Handbuch des Adels, Adelslexikon Band XIV, Seite 54, Band 131 der Gesamtreihe, C. A. Starke Verlag, Limburg (Lahn) 2003
Der Völkerkrieg, Band 2, Seite 106, Casimir Hermann Baer (Herausgeber), Stuttgart 1914

1854 births
1927 deaths
Recipients of the Iron Cross (1914), 1st class
Generals of Artillery (Prussia)
Recipients of the Pour le Mérite (military class)
German Army generals of World War I
People from Harz (district)
People from the Province of Saxony